Harold Robert "Hap" Myers (born July 28, 1947) is a former professional ice hockey defenceman. He played thirteen games in the National Hockey League with the Buffalo Sabres in the 1970–71 season, the team's first in the league. He was scoreless and recorded six penalty minutes. The rest of his career, which lasted from 1968 to 1974, was spent in the minor leagues. He is currently a restaurant owner on the west end of Edmonton, Hap's Hungry House.

Career statistics

Regular season and playoffs

External links
 

1947 births
Living people
Buffalo Sabres players
Canadian ice hockey defencemen
Cincinnati Swords players
Cleveland Barons (1937–1973) players
Edmonton Oil Kings (WCHL) players
Fort Worth Wings players
Salt Lake Golden Eagles (WHL) players
Ice hockey people from Edmonton